Dance is a surname. Notable people with the surname include:

Born before 1900 
William Dance (1755–1840), English pianist and violinist
Nathaniel Dance, (1748–1827), English sailor and commodore
Nathaniel Dance-Holland (1735–1811), English portrait painter and politician
George Dance the Younger (1741–1825), English architect and surveyor
George Dance the Elder (1695–1768), English architect

Born after 1900 
Karol Dance (born 1987), Chilean television presenter
Seb Dance (born 1981), British Labour Party politician
Lada Dance (born 1966), Russian jazz and dance music singer
Suzanne Dance, Australian architect
Sarah Dance, American swimmer
George Dance (politician), leader of the Libertarian Party of Canada 1991–1993
Trevor Dance (born 1958), English football goalkeeper
Steve Dance (born 1957), British racing driver
Terrance Arthur (Terry) Dance  (born 1952), Canadian suffragan bishop
Charles Dance (born 1946), British actor
Bill Dance (television host) (born 1940), American fisherman
Stanley Dance (1910–1999), British jazz writer, business manager, record producer, and historian of the Swing era
James Dance (1907–1981), British Conservative Party politician